Platinum Airport  is a state-owned public-use airport located in Platinum, in the Bethel Census Area of the U.S. state of Alaska.

As per Federal Aviation Administration records, the airport had 1,020 passenger boardings (enplanements) in calendar year 2008, an increase of 60.9% from the 634 enplanements in 2007. This airport is included in the FAA's National Plan of Integrated Airport Systems for 2009–2013, which categorizes it as a general aviation facility.

Facilities 
Platinum Airport has one runway designated 14/32 with a gravel surface measuring 3,300 by 75 feet (1,006 x 23 m).

Airlines and destinations

References

External links 
 FAA Alaska airport diagram (GIF)
 

Airports in the Bethel Census Area, Alaska